The 1965–66 season was Liverpool Football Club's 74th season in existence and their fourth consecutive season in the First Division. Liverpool F.C. won its seventh league title, tying Arsenal's record, with a six-point cushion to Leeds and Burnley. Roger Hunt scored 29 league goals, which earned him a place in the England squad for the World Cup, where he became the first player to win the World Cup representing Liverpool. It was not until 44 years later that Fernando Torres played an active part in the Spanish team winning the World Cup as a Liverpool player.

The season also saw Liverpool reaching its first European final, that of the Cup Winners Cup, losing 2-1 to West German side Borussia Dortmund at Hampden Park in Glasgow, a severe blow to manager Bill Shankly, who had hoped to win his first European trophy in his native Scotland.

The club permanently adopted an all red strip at the start of this season.

Squad

Goalkeepers
  Tommy Lawrence
  William Molyneux

Defenders
  Gerry Byrne
  Chris Lawler
  Thomas Lowry
  Tommy Smith
  Ron Yeats

Midfielders
  Alf Arrowsmith
  Ian Callaghan
  Gordon Milne
  Willie Stevenson
  Ian St. John
  Gordon Wallace
  Peter Thompson

Attackers
  Phil Chisnall
  Bobby Graham
  Roger Hunt
  Geoff Strong

First Division

Table

Matches

FA Charity Shield

FA Cup

European Cup Winners Cup

Final

References

 LFC History.net – 1965-66 season
 Liverweb - 1965-66 Season

Liverpool F.C. seasons
Liverpool
English football championship-winning seasons